Kiran Martin is an Indian pediatrician, social worker and the founder of Asha, a non governmental organization, working towards the health and community development of around 50 slum colonies in and around Delhi, reaching a reported number of 400,000 to 500,000 slum dwellers. She was honored by the Government of India, in 2002, with the fourth highest Indian civilian award of Padma Shri.

Early life
Kiran Martin did her graduate studies in Medicine (MBBS) at the Maulana Azad Medical College, Delhi and completed her advanced studies in pediatrics from the Lady Hardinge Medical College of the University of Delhi in 1985.

Founding of Asha Society
Kiran Martin's career took a turn when Dr. Ambedkar Basti, one of the slums in South Delhi, endured a cholera epidemic, in 1988. She volunteered to provide medical assistance to the slum dwellers and the experience is reported to have prompted her into social service. In order to provide an organized service, she secured like-minded helpers and founded Asha Society, (Action for Securing Health for All) literally meaning Hope in Hindi, a non governmental organization, the same year.

Kiran Martin's Philosophy
Kiran Martin claims that she wanted to pursue a direction in life that gave her vision, values and inspiration. Martin's values are an integral part of the Asha model and include the belief that all people, including the poor, have the same inherent dignity and rights that deserve protection. The Asha model directly challenges the pervasive system of caste and class that exists in Indian society and elsewhere and in particular seeks to redress the unequal treatment of females by empowering women to bring about change in their own communities. Asha was founded with a strong desire for social justice by ensuring the equal distribution of goods, services and the opportunities and benefits of development. Other values that Asha professes are compassion, gratitude, optimism, joy and simplicity. Led by Martin, these values have directed the approach and expansion of Asha's work over two decades and may explain the success that Asha has enjoyed.

Growth and Expansion of Asha
Under the aegis of Asha, Kiran Martin is reported to have started various programs such as medical aid, development of roads, sanitation and water supply facilities and basic and higher education. The organization is known to be covering around 50 colonies and 400,000 to 500,000 people.

Soon after Martin began her health clinics, she began to organise women in the community into advocacy groups to tackle community problems. These women's associations, known as Mahila Mandals, began to successfully lobby officials to secure infrastructure improvements. Asha identified and trained women to become Community Health Volunteers to provide basic healthcare and advice to families in their communities. Children's groups, known as Bal Mandals, were formed to empower children and to provide training in leadership skills to influence their own community and to participate in healthcare and improvement initiatives. Asha provides assistance and encouragement to children and their families to attend and complete primary and secondary education. In 2008, Martin's long-term vision of higher education for Asha slum children was realised. Asha claims that nearly 1200 students are pursuing higher education in the University of Delhi with its assistance. This was followed by the Mentorship and Internship Programmes in 2012 to increase students’ chances of breaking into the competitive job market. Asha assists in getting financial aid from the banks and other financial institutions for the economically compromised people of the slums. Martin is credited with efforts to get the inhabitants of the Delhi slums included in the financial inclusion schemes of the Ministry of Finance.

Awards and recognition

The Government of India, included her in the Republic Day honours list, in 2002, for the civilian award of Padma Shri. Martin has worked with Hon Mr P Chidambaram, India's Home Minister and earlier the Finance Minister, to increase financial inclusion for slum dwellers, and Mr Chidambaram has also taken a keen interest in the progress of Asha's higher education initiative.  The Chief Minister of Delhi has shown support for Martin's work on many occasions, as has the Slum Commissioner of Delhi. Veteran Indian statesman Mr L K Advani has been a long-term supporter of Martin's work. Dr Harsh Vardhan, the Indian Minister for Health, lent support to Asha's model of healthcare during his time as Delhi Health Minister in the 1990s.

Both state and national slum policies have been influenced by Asha's work, and Martin's assistance has recently been sought by Hon Mr Kapil Sibal, India's Minister for Human Resources and Development. In addition to Asha's work being awarded Best Practice by UN-Habitat, it has also been praised, studied and replicated by organisations in many countries. The Nossal Institute of Global Health, in 2011, conducted an analysis of Asha's decision points, ethos, key strategies, lessons learned, and evidence of impact in the context of New Delhi. The results of this were published as Asha: Hope and Transformation in the Slums of Delhi.

International Interest in Asha
Martin is associated with various philanthropic organizations in India and abroad for raising funds for her activities. Asha's work is supported by formal and registered Friends of Asha societies in Great Britain, Australia, Ireland and the USA. In addition, funding agencies such as Tearfund New Zealand, Tear Netherlands and ICCO Netherlands support Asha's work, alongside international governmental agencies such as Irish Aid, NZ Aid, the Japanese government's GGP programme and AusAid.

Numerous overseas visitors have visited Asha and accompanied Martin on slum visits where they saw firsthand the improvements in the health, empowerment and financial status of people in Asha project areas. These visitors have included the Prime Minister of New Zealand, Mr John Key, Australia's Prime Minister, Ms Julia Gillard in 2012, the Governor General of New Zealand, Mr Anand Satyanand, the Governor of Victoria, Mr Alex Chernov, the First Lady of Canada, Mrs Sharon Johnston, the First Lady of Japan, Mrs Miyuki Hatoyama, as well as Cabinet Ministers from Ireland, the UK, Japan, New Zealand and Australia.

Martin has attended many seminars and conferences and has addressed gatherings at the British House of Commons, United States House of Representatives, Harvard University, MIT, Cambridge University, Boston University School of Public Health, Columbia University, Monash University, Melbourne University, the Australia India Institute. Queen's University Belfast, Radio New Zealand has also aired a public address of Martin.

Books 
In 2001, a book entitled Urban Health & Development was published after being written by Martin in collaboration with Dr Beverly Booth and Dr Ted Lankester. In addition, the work of Asha has been cited in publications, research and case studies by institutions such as the World Bank, Tearfund and others.

In 2013, the book A Journey of Hope was published to mark the 25th anniversary of the founding of Asha. It tells the story of Asha through the reflections of Dr Martin and the photographs of Ed Sewell. It includes a foreword by former Australian Prime Minister Julia Gillard.

See also

 UN-Habitat Scroll of Honour Award

References

External links
 
 
 
 
 
 
 

Recipients of the Padma Shri in social work
Living people
Social workers
Indian paediatricians
Medical doctors from Delhi
1959 births
Indian women philanthropists
Indian philanthropists
Indian women medical doctors
20th-century Indian women scientists
20th-century Indian medical doctors
Women scientists from Delhi
Social workers from Delhi
Women educators from Delhi
Educators from Delhi
20th-century women physicians